Horehound is the debut studio album by American rock band the Dead Weather. It was released on July 10 in Australia, July 13 in Europe, and July 14, 2009 in North America. The album was recorded at Third Man Studios during a three-week session in January 2009. The first single from the album, "Hang You from the Heavens", was released through iTunes on March 11, 2009, and on vinyl on April 18, 2009. "Treat Me Like Your Mother" was released as the second single from the album on May 25, 2009. The third single from the album was set to be "I Cut Like A Buffalo" and includes a cover of The West Coast Pop Art Experimental Band's "A Child of a Few Hours is Burning to Death" as a B-side. The album debuted at No. 6 on the U.S. Billboard 200 Album Charts and at No. 14 on the UK Album Charts. As of 2010, sales in the United States have exceeded 163,000 copies, according to Nielsen SoundScan.

Track listing

Charts

Certifications

Personnel
Alison Mosshart – lead vocals, percussion, guitar on "3 Birds" and "I Cut Like a Buffalo"
Jack White – drums, vocals, acoustic guitar on "Will There Be Enough Water?", production
Dean Fertita – guitar, organ, piano, synthesizer, backing vocals, bass on "Rocking Horse"
Jack Lawrence – bass, backing vocals, drums on "Will There Be Enough Water?", guitar on "Rocking Horse"

References

2009 debut albums
The Dead Weather albums
Warner Records albums
Albums produced by Jack White
Third Man Records albums